The Journal of the European Economic Association is a peer-reviewed academic journal covering all aspects of economics. It was established in 2003 and is published by Wiley-Blackwell on behalf of the European Economic Association. The current managing editor is Imran Rasul, Professor of Economics at University College London. 

According to the Journal Citation Reports, the journal has a 2020 impact factor of 4.583.

References

External links
 

English-language journals
Publications established in 2003
Economics journals
Wiley-Blackwell academic journals
Bimonthly journals
Academic journals associated with international learned and professional societies of Europe